Ralph Drew Flanagan (December 14, 1918 – February 8, 1988) was an American competition swimmer who represented the United States at two consecutive Summer Olympics during the 1930s.

As a 13-year-old at the 1932 Summer Olympics in Los Angeles, California, Flanagan competed in the semifinals of the men's 1,500-meter freestyle.  Four years later at the 1936 Summer Olympics in Berlin, Germany, he won a silver medal as a member of the second-place U.S. team in the men's 4×200-meter freestyle relay.  Individually, he finished fourth in the men's 400-meter freestyle and fifth in the men's 1,500-meter freestyle.

Flanagan was inducted into the International Swimming Hall of Fame as an "Honor Swimmer" in 1978.

See also
 List of members of the International Swimming Hall of Fame
 List of Olympic medalists in swimming (men)
 List of University of Texas at Austin alumni

References

1918 births
1988 deaths
American male freestyle swimmers
Olympic silver medalists for the United States in swimming
People from Los Alamitos, California
Swimmers from California
Swimmers at the 1932 Summer Olympics
Swimmers at the 1936 Summer Olympics
Texas Longhorns men's swimmers
Medalists at the 1936 Summer Olympics